"The Emperor's New Cloak" is the 162nd episode of the television series Star Trek: Deep Space Nine. The 12th episode of the seventh season. It premiered the week of February 1, 1999 to Nielsen ratings of 4.6.

Set in the 24th century, the series follows the adventures of the crew of the space station Deep Space Nine. This episode takes place mostly in the Mirror Universe, a parallel universe that is home to more aggressive, mistrustful, and opportunistic doppelgangers of the regular characters of the Star Trek universe, governed by a brutal alliance of the Cardassian and Klingon races. In this episode, the Ferengi characters Quark and Rom travel to the Mirror Universe to rescue the kidnapped Grand Nagus Zek, leader of the Ferengi Alliance.

The episode was directed by LeVar Burton and written by Ira Steven Behr and Hans Beimler.

Plot
The Mirror Universe counterpart of Ezri Dax shows up at Quark's quarters on Deep Space Nine with a message: Zek went to the Mirror Universe in search of business opportunities and was kidnapped by the Alliance, who demand that Quark exchange a cloaking device—a device that can render a starship invisible—for Zek's freedom. Quark and Rom steal a cloaking device from the Klingon General Martok's ship, which they hide by cloaking the device. They get the device to Ezri, and are forced to transport to the Mirror Universe with her when Martok discovers the theft.

Upon arriving at Terok Nor (the Mirror counterpart of Deep Space Nine), now under the control of the human rebellion against the Alliance, the three are arrested, since the Rebellion cannot allow the Alliance to gain such cloaking technology. They are rescued by Ezri's friend, the Mirror counterpart of Quark's rival Brunt. Brunt brings them to the Regent of the Alliance, the Mirror counterpart of Worf.

They learn that the mirror Kira Nerys—formerly the Alliance's brutal overseer of Terok Nor, now out of favor with the Alliance, and Ezri's lover—planned the entire affair; the Alliance never intended to release Zek. Brunt persuades Worf not to execute the Ferengi immediately, and Rom and Quark are imprisoned with Zek. Kira kills Brunt when he tries to convince her to release them. Ezri, disgusted by Kira's callous murder of her friend, turns against her.

Rom is forced to install the cloaking device on the Regent's ship, but despite his cooperation, he and Quark are still sentenced to die at the hands of Mirror Elim Garak. They distract Garak by comparing him to the Garak of their own universe, which delays him long enough for Ezri to arrive and inject him with the poison meant for the Ferengi.

Worf has the cloaking device activated, only to find that Rom has sabotaged the device to drain the ship's power. The powerless Alliance ship is easily overpowered by the Rebels' Defiant, forcing Worf to surrender to the Rebels. The Rebels bring the Ferengi back to Terok Nor, from which they can return to their own universe.

Notes

 This episode was dedicated to the memory of the recently deceased Jerome Bixby, who wrote the original Star Trek episode "Mirror, Mirror" that introduced the "Mirror Universe" featured in this and several other episodes of the many Star Trek series.
 The episode is notable for including one of the few homosexual relationships depicted in the series, between the alternate universe equivalents of Kira Nerys and Ezri Tigan.
In his rewatch of the episode, Keith DeCandido noted a "major continuity error" in that cloaking technology was indeed seen being used by the Alliance in a previous Mirror Universe episode, "Through the Looking Glass".

Continuity

This is the last of five Mirror Universe episodes of Star Trek: Deep Space Nine; the others are "Crossover", "Through the Looking Glass", "Shattered Mirror", and "Resurrection. The Mirror Universe was introduced in "Mirror, Mirror", an episode of Star Trek: The Original Series which aired on October 6, 1967.

Reception
Keith DeCandido, reviewing the episode for Tor.com in 2015, gave the episode a rating of 1 out of 10, describing the plot as predictable and the Mirror Universe conceit as having worn out its welcome and become impossible to take seriously. Zack Handlen, reviewing the episode in 2014 for The A.V. Club, also gave it a negative review, calling the Mirror characters poorly developed and the writing "jokey and disengaged". In 2017, SyFy ranked this the second-worst of the seven Mirror Universe episodes of the Star Trek franchise that had aired up to that date.

References

External links
 

1999 American television episodes
American LGBT-related television episodes
Mirror Universe (Star Trek) episodes
Star Trek: Deep Space Nine (season 7) episodes
Television episodes directed by LeVar Burton